Airport (Spanish: Aeropuerto) is a 1953 Spanish comedy film directed by Luis Lucia, and starring Fernando Fernán Gómez, Margarita Andrey, and Fernando Rey.

Cast
 Fernando Fernán Gómez as Luis
 Margarita Andrey as Lilliane
 Fernando Rey as Fernando
 María Asquerino as María
 María Teresa Reina as Isabel 
 Manolo Morán as Beltrán
 Julia Caba Alba as Albertina
 Juan Vázquez as Ceferino
 José Isbert as Manolo
 Fernando Sancho as Mr. Fogg
 Elvira Quintillá as Florista
 Antonio Riquelme as Comisario
 José Franco as Señor Comas
 Félix Fernández as M. Lacombre
 Adriano Domínguez as Mendoza
 Manuel Arbó 
 Ramón Elías as Maitre de la boite
 Casimiro Hurtado as Emilio
 Xan das Bolas 
 Lola del Pino as Lola
 Ana de Leyva 
 Arturo Marín as Pepe "El Tasca"
 Manuel Guitián as Camarero
 Félix Dafauce 
 Manuel Dicenta as Ramón
 Valeriano Andrés as Peña
 Manuel Requena as Nemesio
 Milagros Carrión as Kioskera
 Delia Luna 
 Manuel San Román as Policía
 Mercedes Muñoz Sampedro as Criada de Fernanda
 Juana Ginzo
 José Sepúlveda
 José Blanch 
 Juanita Reina as Canzonetista 
 Francisco Bernal as Taxista de Isabel
 Eduardo Fajardo as Man in disco
 Charito Leonís as Bailarina 
 José Manuel Martín 
 Antonio Ozores as Dependiente
 Ángel Álvarez as Lorenzo

References

Bibliography 
 Bentley, Bernard. A Companion to Spanish Cinema. Boydell & Brewer 2008.

External links 
 

1953 comedy films
Spanish comedy films
1953 films
1950s Spanish-language films
Films directed by Luis Lucia
Cifesa films
1950s Spanish films